The Energy Transition Commission (ETC) is an international think tank, focusing on economic growth and climate change mitigation. It was created in September 2015 and is based in London. The commission currently contains 32 commissioners from a selection of individuals and company and government leaders.

Activities 
The primary activity of the commission is publishing reports and position papers. They are typically supported by a body of readily available or explicitly commissioned data sets provided by various independent or industry-related organizations. The findings of reports are then reviewed through a broad consultation process within and outside of the commission. Finally, the report or position paper is redacted and generally understood to constitute the collective view of the ETC commission. Although individual commissioners may disagree with particular findings or recommendations, the general direction of the arguments developed in the publications is guided by consensus.

Publications 
Since its founding in 2015, the commission has published two extensive reports and half a dozen papers. For example, Pathways from Paris – Accessing the INDC Opportunity, is a 25-page study of INDCs (i.e. the plans developed by individual countries and submitted at the 2015 UN Climate Change Conference in Paris).  This investigation highlighted the mechanisms various countries utilize in order to reduce emissions and identify opportunities for further reductions. News outlets of general interest and the specialized press reported summaries of these reports. Both reports outlined below were cited as reference to several articles in a 2018 special report edition of The Economist magazine.

Better Energy, Greater Prosperity 
This 120-page report recognized the opportunity to halve global carbon emissions by 2040.
According to the report, it is possible to simultaneously ensure economic development and access affordable, sustainable energy for all, while reducing carbon emissions by half the current output.

The report suggested four strategies to be concurrently implemented:

 Accelerate clean electricity access.
 Decarbonize beyond power generation, using bioenergy, hydrogen, and carbon capture for industrial activities and transport modes which cannot be electrified in an economical fashion.
 Improve energy productivity by targeting a 3% energy productivity per year (compared to 1.5% currently)
 Optimize usage of remaining fossil fuel uses

According to the report, the strategies listed above would have reduced fossil fuel consumption by 30%, but 50% of energy needs would have needed to be met with fossil fuels. This, the report explained, could be solved by optimizing usage of these sources by switching from coal to gas, by preventing methane leakages, and by stopping routine flaring. Another area of optimization would come from carbon capture or sequestration such as underground storage, and finally a decrease in fossil fuel use.

The report suggested two solutions for energy policy:

 Increased investment, keeping in mind that the investment required by the transition is estimated to be between $300-600 billion USD annually. At this level, the cost would not cause a significant macroeconomic challenge, relative to the approximately $20 trillion in anticipated savings and investments annually. The issue is more one of a shift in the mix of investments: moving away from fossil fuels and toward low carbon technologies and energy-efficient equipment and infrastructure.
 Public governance, with the introduction of coherent and predictable policies which favour the energetic transition, along with the phasing out of fossil fuel subsidies and the introduction of carbon pricing.

Mission Possible 
This 172-page report focused on the "hard to abate sectors", namely:
 Heavy industry: cement, steel and plastics
 Heavy duty transport: heavy road transport, maritime shipping, and aviation

Collectively, these sectors currently represent approximately 30% of energy emissions, with the potential to increase to 60% by 2050 (due to the reduction of the share owed to other sectors, and to the demand growth in these hard to abate sectors).

The report concluded that full decarbonization of these sectors is feasible and the cost to the global economy would be less than 0.5% of GDP by 2050. It also identifies cement, plastics and shipping as the most challenging sectors, due to process emissions, end-of-life emissions and the fragmented nature of the maritime industry respectively. The feasibility if not inevitability of some of these transitions, for example these concerning the industrial production of ammonia, are echoed (or in some cases originate from) the respective industry sectors.

Funding 
The ETC is funded by various businesses and organizations, including major oil and gas companies – this was a source of concern from many observers.  Current or past sponsors include  Bank of America Merrill Lynch, BHP Billiton, Energy Systems Catapult, CO2 Sciences, the European Climate Foundation, the Grantham Foundation and the UN Foundation. Regardless of funding every Commissioner has an equal voice and participation in ETC activities.

List of commissioners

References 

Think tanks based in the United Kingdom
Emissions reduction